Jorge Alberto Ramos Comas (born September 11, 1946) was a Puerto Rican politician and former senator. He was a member of the Senate of Puerto Rico from 1997 to 2000 representing the Popular Democratic Party (PPD).

Early years and studies
Jorge Alberto Ramos Comas was born on September 11, 1946, in Mayagüez, Puerto Rico. He finished his elementary and high school in his hometown. In 1968, Ramos received a Bachelor's degree in Social Science from the Pontifical Catholic University of Puerto Rico.

Professional career
Ramos worked for five years for the Puerto Rico Department of Education. As a library teacher, he contributed to the creation of a rural newspaper.

Ramos also worked as an instructor of a federal program with the Aqueduct and Sewer Authority of Puerto Rico.

Political career

Representative: 1972-1976
Ramos began his political career at the age of 24 when he ran for the Puerto Rico House of Representatives at the 1972 general elections. He served as representative from 1972 to 1976.

Mayor of San Germán: 1981-1996
Ramos Comas ran for mayor of San Germán at the 1980 general elections. He was elected and sworn on January 12, 1981. He was reelected for the position on 1984, 1988, and 1992, finishing his last term in 1996.

Senator: 1997-2000
After serving four terms as Mayor of San Germán, Ramos Comas decided to run for the Senate of Puerto Rico, representing the District of Mayagüez. He was elected at the 1996 general elections.

Death and legacy
Ramos Comas died on August 20, 2000, at the age of 53. He was three months away from finishing his term as senator.

On August 21, 2011, the Senate dedicated the opening of their second ordinary session to Ramos Comas. They also named a legislative internship after him. The same day, the Senate also approved a bill to rename an avenue in San Germán after Ramos Comas.

Personal life
Ramos Comas was married to Minerva Vélez Jusino. They had two children together: Jurisam and Jorge. The latter was also a member of the Senate of Puerto Rico from 2001 to 2004.

References

External links
Jorge Alberto Ramos Comas on BPSanGerman.org

1946 births
2000 deaths
People from Mayagüez, Puerto Rico
Mayors of places in Puerto Rico
Members of the Senate of Puerto Rico
Pontifical Catholic University of Puerto Rico alumni
Popular Democratic Party members of the House of Representatives of Puerto Rico
20th-century American politicians